Amwa Khas is a village in Uttar Pradesh state of India. It is located in the Tamkuhi Raj tehsil of Kushinagar district. It is one among the 91 villages of Dudahi block of Kushinagar district.

Demographics
According to the 2011 census of India, the village has  2,111 households with 12,920 people. population of persons below age 6 is 2,096. Population of Scheduled Caste is 0.0128% (1663) and Scheduled Tribes is 0.0275% (356).

The effective literacy rate of the village (i.e. literacy rate of persons aged 6 and above) is 46% (6016). It has an area of  26.6107 square km.

Rivers
The Gandaki River runs from North to South-East and divides the villages in eastern and western halves. Most of the habitations of peoples are located in western half of village.

References 

Villages in Kushinagar district